Anti-neurofascin demyelinating diseases (anti-NF diseases) refers to health conditions engendered by auto-antibodies against neurofascins, which can produce both central and peripheral demyelination. Some cases of combined central and peripheral demyelination (CCPD) could be produced by them.
 Chronic inflammatory demyelinating polyneuropathy: Some cases of CIDP are reported to be produced by auto-antibodies against several neurofascin proteins. These proteins are present in the neurons and four of them have been reported to produce disease: NF186, NF180, NF166 and NF155.
 Neuromyelitis optica: NF auto antibodies can also appear in NMO cases. These antibodies are more related to the peripheral nervous demyelination, but they were also found in NMO.
 Multiple sclerosis: Also antibodies against Neurofascins NF-155 can also appear in atypical multiple sclerosis and NF-186 could be involved in subtypes of MS yielding an intersection between both conditions. Around 10% of MS cases are now thought to be anti-NF cases.

History

The first report about a subgroup of MS patients with anti-NF and contactin 2 auto-antibodies was published in 2011

References

Neurological disorders